Rock Lake Provincial Park  is a provincial park in Alberta, Canada, located on the shores of Rock Lake,  north-west from Hinton, north on the Bighorn Highway and 39 km west on an access road.

It is managed by Alberta Tourism, Parks and Recreation and operated by Hinton Wood Products company.

There is, or was a bombshelter located in the basement of the ranger station.

Activities
The following activities are available in the park:
Camping
Canoeing and kayaking
Fishing (Bull trout, Lake trout, Mountain whitefish, Northern pike)
Backcountry and front country hiking
Horseback riding (the park is a primary staging area for Willmore Wilderness Park's 750 km of equestrian and hiking trails)
Mountain biking
Power boating
Swimming

See also
List of provincial parks in Alberta
List of Canadian provincial parks
List of National Parks of Canada

References

External links

Provincial parks of Alberta
Parks in the Canadian Rockies
Yellowhead County